Yevgeni Aleksandrovich Kazadayev (born 13 March 1996) is a Russian football player.

Club career
He made his debut in the Russian Football National League for FC Tambov on 22 July 2017 in a game against FC Spartak-2 Moscow.

References

External links
 Profile by Russian Football National League

1996 births
Footballers from Tambov
Living people
Russian footballers
Association football midfielders
FC Tambov players